Carroll's Corner is a rural community in the northwestern part of the Halifax Regional Municipality in the Musquodoboit Valley of Nova Scotia, Canada. The community is located along Highway 277 and extends to the North and South along the Milford Road and Antrim Road, respectively. The community was named after its first settler, John Carroll.  

The world's largest open pit gypsum mine, owned by National Gypsum Company, is located partially in Carroll's Corner. The discovery of mastodon fossils in the mine in 1991 led to the community's annual week-long 'Mastodon Days' celebration in July.

References

External links
HRM Civic Address Map
Carrolls Corner Community Centre

Communities in Halifax, Nova Scotia